In mathematics, a diffeology on a set generalizes the concept of smooth charts in a differentiable manifold, declaring what the "smooth parametrizations" in the set are.

The concept was first introduced by Jean-Marie Souriau in the 1980s under the name Espace différentiel and later developed by his students Paul Donato and Patrick Iglesias. A related idea was introduced by Kuo-Tsaï Chen (陳國才, Chen Guocai) in the 1970s, using convex sets instead of open sets for the domains of the plots.

Intuitive definition 

A diffeological space consists of a set together with a collection of maps (called a diffeology) satisfying suitable axioms, which generalise the notion of an atlas on a manifold. In this way, the relationship between smooth manifolds and diffeological spaces is analogous to the relationship between topological manifolds and topological spaces:

This abstract point of view makes no reference to a specific atlas (and therefore to a fixed dimension ) nor to the underlying topological space, and is therefore suitable to treat examples of objects more general than manifolds.

Formal definition

 Every constant map is a plot.
 For a given map, if every point in the domain has a neighborhood such that restricting the map to this neighborhood is a plot, then the map itself is a plot.
A set together with a diffeology is called a diffeological space.

Morphisms 
A map between diffeological spaces is called differentiable (or smooth) if and only if its composition with any plot of the first space is a plot of the second space. It is called a diffeomorphism if it is differentiable, bijective, and its inverse is also differentiable.

Diffeological spaces form a category, whose morphisms are differentiable maps. The category of diffeological spaces is closed under many categorical operations: for instance, it is Cartesian closed, complete and cocomplete, and more generally it is a quasitopos.

Additional structures 
Any diffeological space is automatically a topological space with the so-called D-topology: the finest topology such that all plots are continuous (with respect to the euclidean topology on ). A differentiable map between diffeological spaces is automatically continuous between their D-topologies.

A Cartan-De Rham calculus can be developed in the framework of diffeology, as well as a suitable adaptation of the notions of fiber bundles, homotopy, etc. However, there is not a canonical definition of tangent spaces and tangent bundles for diffeological spaces.

Examples

Manifolds

With this diffeology, a map between two smooth manifolds is smooth if and only if it is differentiable in the diffeological sense. Accordingly, smooth manifolds with smooth maps form a full subcategory of the category of diffeological spaces. 
 Similarly, complex manifolds, analytic manifolds, etc. have natural diffeologies consisting of the maps preserving the extra structure. 
 This method of modeling diffeological spaces can be extended to locals models which are not necessarily the euclidean space .
Any Banach manifold is a diffeological space.
Any Fréchet manifold is a diffeological space.

Constructions from other diffeological spaces

In other words, the pushforward diffeology is the smallest diffeology on  making  differentiable. The quotient diffeology boils down to the pushforward diffeology by the projection . 
In other words, the pullback diffeology is the smallest diffeology on  making  differentiable.
 The functional diffeology between two diffeological spaces  is the diffeology on the set  of differentiable maps, whose plots are the maps  such that  is smooth (with respect to the product diffeology of ).

More general examples

 Any set can be endowed with the coarse (or trivial, or indiscrete) diffeology, i.e. the largest possible diffeology (any map is a plot). The corresponding D-topology is the trivial topology. 
Any set can be endowed with the discrete (or fine) diffeology, i.e. the smallest possible diffeology (the only plots are the locally constant maps). The corresponding D-topology is the discrete topology. 
Any topological space can be endowed with the continuous diffeology, whose plots are all continuous maps.
 Quotients gives an easy way to construct non-manifold diffeologies. For example, the set of real numbers  is a smooth manifold. The quotient , for some irrational , called irrational torus, is a diffeological space diffeomorphic to the quotient of the regular 2-torus  by a line of slope . It has a non-trivial diffeology, but its D-topology is the trivial topology.
Combining the subspace diffeology and the functional diffeology, one can define diffeologies on the space of sections of a fibre bundle, or the space of bisections of a Lie groupoid, etc.

Subductions and inductions 
Analogously to the notions of submersions and immersions between manifolds, there are two special classes of morphisms between diffeological spaces. Note that subductions and inductions are automatically smooth.

Moreover, these notions enjoy similar properties to submersion and immersions, such as:

 A composition  is a subduction (respectively, induction) if and only if  is a subduction (respectively,  is an induction).
 An injective subduction (respectively, a surjective induction) is a diffeomorphism.

Last, an embedding is an induction which is also a homeomorphism with its image, with respect to the subset topology induced from the D-topology of the codomain. This boils down to the standard notion of embedding between manifolds.

References

External links
 Patrick Iglesias-Zemmour: Diffeology (book), Mathematical Surveys and Monographs, vol. 185, American Mathematical Society, Providence, RI USA [2013].
 Patrick Iglesias-Zemmour: Diffeology (many documents)
 diffeology.net Global hub on diffeology and related topics

Differential geometry
Functions and mappings
Chen, Guocai
Smooth manifolds